Hoby F. J. Brenner (born June 2, 1959) is a former American football tight end who played professionally in the National Football League (NFL) for the New Orleans Saints.

High school career
Brenner prepped at Fullerton Union High School. His teammate at Fullerton Union High was future NFL player Keith Van Horne of the Chicago Bears.

College career
Brenner played college football at the University of Southern California (USC) was a selection on the 1980 All-Pacific-10 Conference football team.

Professional career
Brenner played for the New Orleans Saints between 1981 and 1993.  He was a Pro Bowl selection in 1987.

References

1959 births
Living people
American football tight ends
New Orleans Saints players
USC Trojans football players
National Conference Pro Bowl players
People from Lynwood, California
Players of American football from California
Sportspeople from Los Angeles County, California